Peter Urban (born 24 February 1938) is a Canadian fencer. He competed in the individual and team sabre events at the 1976 Summer Olympics.

References

1938 births
Living people
Canadian male sabre fencers
Olympic fencers of Canada
Fencers at the 1976 Summer Olympics
People from Baja, Hungary
Fencers at the 1970 British Commonwealth Games
Commonwealth Games competitors for Canada